Events from the year 1972 in Jordan.

Incumbents
Monarch: Hussein 
Prime Minister: Ahmad al-Lawzi

Events

Attempted military coup thwarted

Deaths

 Mohammad Daoud Al-Abbasi.

See also

 Years in Iraq
 Years in Syria
 Years in Saudi Arabia

References

 
1970s in Jordan
Jordan
Jordan
Years of the 20th century in Jordan